The 1985 Mid-Eastern Athletic Conference men's basketball tournament took place March 7–9, 1985 at the Palestra in Philadelphia, Pennsylvania.  defeated , 71–69 in the championship game, to win its fourth consecutive MEAC Tournament title.

The Aggies earned an automatic bid to the 1985 NCAA tournament as a No. 16 seed in the Midwest region.

Format
Six of seven conference members participated, with play beginning in the quarterfinal round. Teams were seeded based on their regular season conference record. After finishing 7th in the regular season standings,  did not participate.

Bracket

* denotes overtime period

References

MEAC men's basketball tournament
1984–85 Mid-Eastern Athletic Conference men's basketball season
MEAC men's basketball tournament
Basketball competitions in Philadelphia
College basketball tournaments in Pennsylvania